William Henry Barrett (3 August 1893–1979) was an English footballer who played in the Football League for Leicester City.

References

1893 births
1962 deaths
English footballers
Association football defenders
English Football League players
Bromsgrove Rovers F.C. players
Nuneaton Borough F.C. players
Leicester City F.C. players
Derby County F.C. players
Hinckley United F.C. players
Hereford United F.C. players